Somersault is a 2004 Australian romantic drama film written and directed by Cate Shortland (in her feature directorial debut). Shot in the winter of 2003, it was released on 16 September 2004 and screened in the Un Certain Regard section at the 2004 Cannes Film Festival. It also swept the field at the 2004 Australian Film Institute Awards, winning every single feature film award (13 in total).

Exploring the themes of human sexuality, alienation and emotion, Somersault is about a 16-year-old girl named Heidi (Abbie Cornish) who flees her Canberra home to the mountain town of Jindabyne in New South Wales. There she meets Joe (Worthington), the son of a local farmer, and gradually forms a relationship with him, despite his difficulty in expressing his feelings. He also seems to be unsure of his sexual orientation, despite having better-than-average luck meeting women.

The soundtrack is written and performed by Australian band Decoder Ring. At the ARIA Music Awards of 2004 the soundtrack was nominated for Best Original Soundtrack Album.

Plot
Heidi, a pretty teenager living in the Canberra suburbs, tries to seduce her mother Nicole's boyfriend. and flees home when her mother catches her. She takes a bus to a ski resort in the Snowy River National Park where a man lives who once gave her his business card and invited her to contact him if she was ever in town. However, when she phones him, his wife answers the phone and he says that he does not remember her. She meets some other teenagers at a club and goes home with one of the boys. In the morning, the boy she slept with tells her he is going back to Sydney and, when she asks if she can go with him, one of his friends says he already has a girlfriend. She tries flirtation to get a job in a ski equipment shop. When that fails she implies she's willing to trade sexual favors for cash but the man brushes her off. She also tries to talk to a man in a parked car who was eyeing her, but without success.

In a bar, a young man called Joe who saw her in the club the previous night buys her a drink and strikes up a conversation. Without anywhere to sleep, she asks to go with him and he takes her to a motel but leaves quickly for work in the morning without suggesting further contact. She strikes up a friendship with Irene, the woman who runs the motel who gives her breakfast. She asks vainly for a job but, after Heidi says that her mother is dead, Irene allows her to stay in the room and pay the following day. Irene warns her that the resort is now out of season and there are no jobs available. Heidi calls Joe at his parents' farm but he doesn't return her calls. Irene, knowing she doesn't have the money for the room, puts her in her son's flat, though she still wants rent in due course. In order to pay for it, Heidi needs a job, and is hired at a petrol station. Joe sees her by accident and they go for a drink and back to her flat. Her co-worker is Bianca and they become friends later on after Bianca's mother offers her a lift home, where Joe is waiting at her flat. This begins a tentative dating relationship between the two.

One night, Joe and Heidi encounter some of his friends, who mock her for working in a petrol station. When Joe and Heidi go to a Chinese restaurant, she asks him if he loves her, and when he refuses to make any commitment or even discuss it, swallows a small bowl of hot chili peppers. He drags her to the bathroom to sick it up and takes her back to the motel. He then goes to a party where his friends who mocked Heidi are hanging out. After having a big fight with one of his friends over Heidi, he then visits a gay neighbour, Richard, who is in town for a few days clearing out his relative's house before it goes to auction. Joe tells him how much he is obsessed with Heidi. He is drinking a lot of whisky and is really drunk. Richard tells Joe he's too drunk to drive so he will drive him home, but Joe intercepts by kissing Richard who kisses him back. Richard says he doesn't think Joe knows what he wants. Joe says nothing and disappears presumably into Richard's bedroom. The next morning, Joe drives home and his father is reading the newspaper at the breakfast table. Joe tells his father he's drunk and begins to cry intensely in front of his father then he says he's alright. His father ignores his emotional distress. 

Meanwhile Heidi is alone and upset from being rejected, neglected, and ignored for several days by Joe after the chili pepper incident. One evening while hanging out with Bianca she discovers that Bianca's father is the man she propositioned in the ski equipment shop. When Heidi tries to leave, Bianca's father offers her a ride home and tells her to stay away from his daughter because Heidi is a bad influence. The next day at work Bianca is cold and distant. When Heidi asks why, Bianca confesses her father told her everything. Angry, Heidi quits by storming out of the petrol station. That evening she goes to the night club and gets drunk. Two young men pick her up and go home with her and they smoke cannabis. Although she is barely conscious, they kiss and undress her. One of the men undresses and is about to have sex with her even though the other man objects to this at which point Joe comes in. The nude man is insolent with Joe so Joe punches him in the face until he starts bleeding. After they leave, he condemns Heidi's promiscuity and she accuses Joe of not caring for her, which he does not deny and drives off, despite her following him out to his car naked and begging him to stay.

The next morning, Irene tells Heidi that, after the scene the night before, she is no longer welcome to stay. Heidi forces Irene to admit that her son is in prison for murder and confesses that her mother was not dead after all, and she had to leave because she tried to seduce her mother's boyfriend. Irene asks Heidi to call her mother and make amends. Later the next day, Heidi has packed up her things and is returning from a walk. Joe is waiting for her and is surprised to learn that Heidi is leaving. As they sit side-by-side on the bed waiting for Heidi's mother to come pick her up, Joe reaches out and holds Heidi's hand — something he had difficulty doing previously. 

The film ends as Heidi's mother arrives. Joe tries to give Heidi a kiss goodbye but Heidi stops him and says she's glad they met. As she walks away, Joe calls out to her. Heidi turns around and they share a tender farewell smile. She then goes to her mother who embraces her, and they drive off as Heidi rolls down the window and watches the icy scenery go by.

Cast
 Abbie Cornish as Heidi
 Sam Worthington as Joe
 Hollie Andrew as Bianca
 Olivia Pigeot as Nicole
 Lynette Curran as Irene
 Damian De Montemas as Adam
 Leah Purcell as Diane
 Nathaniel Dean as Stuart
 Anne Louise Lambert as Martha
 Erik Thomson as Richard
 Ben Tate as Sean

Reception
Somersault grossed $2,158,574 at the box office in Australia and was well received by critics. On review aggregator Rotten Tomatoes, the film has an approval rating of 84% based on 69 reviews, with an average rating of 6.9/10. The website's critics consensus reads, "A poignant coming-of-age tale marked by a breakout lead performance from Abbie Cornish and a successful directorial debut from Cate Shortland." On Metacritic, the film has a weighted average score of 73, based on 21 critics, indicating "generally favorable reviews".

Margaret Pomeranz and David Stratton of At the Movies both praised the film, giving it 4 stars. In her review, Pomeranz wrote "There's no doubting Cate Shortland's talent. Her vision for this film is delicate and wrenching, tentatively optimistic. I have images from the film that haunt me still, Heidi’s hands – that ultimate connecting point of us all, her vulnerable body wrapped up against the cold in her pale blue parka, the landscape of that world at the bottom of the mountains". She gave additional praise to the performances of the cast.

Fenella Kernebone for SBS noted "Somersault is a real labour of love for Cate Shortland and every element in the film is carefully considered."  Kernebone awarded the film four stars out of five. Somersault premiered at the 2004 Cannes Film Festival, where it was screened apart of the Un Certain Regard and was the only Australian feature film at the festival that year.

Accolades
In the 2004 AFI Awards held on 29 October at Regent Theatre, Melbourne, Somersault made history by winning in all 13 categories. The film won the following awards: Best Film (awarded to producers Anthony Anderson and Jan Chapman); Best Direction (Cate Shortland); Best Original Screenplay (Cate Shortland); Best Actress in a Leading Role (Abbie Cornish); Best Actor in a Leading Role (Sam Worthington); Best Actress in a Supporting Role (Lynette Curran); Best Actor in a Supporting Role (Erik Thomson); Best Editing (Scott Gray); Best Cinematography (Robert Humphreys, A.C.S.); Best Sound (Mark Blackwell, Peter Smith and Sam Petty); Best Original Music Score (Decoder Ring); Best Production Design (Melinda Doring); Best Costume Design (Emily Seresin).

Somersault was also a big winner at the 2004 Film Critics Circle of Australia (FCCA) Annual Awards where it picked up five awards: Best Film; Best Director (Cate Shortland); Best Actress (Abbie Cornish); Best Cinematography (Robert Humphreys); Best Actress in a Supporting Role (Lynette Curran).

The film also dominated the publicly voted Lexus IF Awards, taking out six of its eight nominations. It won awards in the following categories: Best Director (Cate Shortland), Best Music, Best Cinematography, Best Script, Best Feature Film and Best Actress for Abbie Cornish.

References

Further reading
 Film Critics Circle of Australia (November 2004). FCCA Annual Awards for Australian Film. Press Release.

External links
 
 Somersault at Oz Movies

2004 films
2004 directorial debut films
2004 romantic drama films
2000s teen drama films
2000s teen romance films
APRA Award winners
Australian independent films
2004 independent films
Australian romantic drama films
Australian teen drama films
Films about runaways
Films directed by Cate Shortland
Films set in Canberra
Films set in New South Wales
2000s English-language films
Australian LGBT-related films
2004 LGBT-related films
LGBT-related drama films